Perameles is a genus of marsupials of the order Peramelemorphia. They are referred to as long-nosed bandicoots or barred bandicoots.

Perameles, or ‘pouched badger’, is a hybrid word, from the Greek  (πήρα, ‘pouch, bag’) and the Latin  (‘marten, badger’).

More than half the known recent species of Perameles have been driven to extinction, although these extinct species were long considered conspecific with P. bougainville, a 2018 study determined them to be distinct species.

The extant species are:
Western barred bandicoot (P. bougainville)
Eastern barred bandicoot (P. gunnii)
Long-nosed bandicoot (P. nasuta)
Queensland barred bandicoot (P. pallescens)
The recently extinct species are:
†Desert bandicoot (P. eremiana)
†New South Wales barred bandicoot (P. fasciata)
†Southwestern barred bandicoot (P. myosuros)
†Southern barred bandicoot (P. notina)
†Nullarbor barred bandicoot (P. papillon)

Fossil species are,
†P. allinghamensis
†P. bowensis
†P. sobbei
†P. wilkinsonorum

References

External links
ARKive - images and movies of the western barred bandicoot (Perameles bougainville)

Peramelemorphs
Marsupials of Australia
Mammal genera
Taxa named by Étienne Geoffroy Saint-Hilaire